Dagny Lind (7 November 1902 – 13 January 1992) was a Swedish film actress. She appeared in 15 films between 1923 and 1977.

Filmography

References

External links

1902 births
1992 deaths
Swedish film actresses
Swedish silent film actresses
Actresses from Stockholm
20th-century Swedish actresses